Dives Akuru is a Unicode block containing characters from the Dhives Akuru script, which was used for writing the Maldivian language up until the 20th century.

Block

History
The following Unicode-related documents record the purpose and process of defining specific characters in the Dives Akuru block:

References 

Unicode blocks